Gibraltarian English (abbreviated GibE) denotes the accent of English spoken in the British Overseas Territory of Gibraltar. The English language has been present at Gibraltar for approximately 300 years, and during these centuries English has mixed with diverse languages, particularly Andalusian Spanish. Gibraltarian English has become a subject of study for linguists interested in how English and other languages mix. While the primary language of Gibraltarians is a variety of Andalusian Spanish called Llanito or Yanito, Gibraltarian English has become more prominent, and there has been a theory proposed that this variety of English is becoming "nativised". Gibraltarian English is similar in many respects to British English, particularly southern varieties.

See also
Languages of Gibraltar

References

Dialects of English
Languages of Gibraltar
Languages of the United Kingdom